Seth H. Kenney (February 22, 1836 – May 24, 1917) was an American farmer and politician.

Kenney was born in Massachusetts and then moved to Morristown, Rice County, Minnesota in 1857 with his wife and family. He was a farmer. Kenney served in the Minnesota House of Representatives in 1879 and 1880.

References

1836 births
1917 deaths
People from Massachusetts
People from Rice County, Minnesota
Farmers from Minnesota
Members of the Minnesota House of Representatives